Upanāha (Sanskrit; Tibetan phonetic: khön du dzinpa) is a Buddhist term translated as "resentment" or "enmity". It is defined as clinging to an intention to cause harm, and withholding forgiveness.  It is one of the twenty subsidiary unwholesome mental factors within the Mahayana Abhidharma teachings.

The Abhidharma-samuccaya states:

What is resentment? It is not letting go of an obsession which develops through association with the anger which underlies it. Its function is to be the basis of non-endurance.

Alan Wallace described upanāha as "a lingering holding of anger (Sanskrit: krodha)".

See also 
 Mental factors (Buddhism)

References

Sources

External links 
 Ranjung Yeshe wiki entry for  'khon_du_'dzin_pa

Unwholesome factors in Buddhism
Sanskrit words and phrases